Ayyar may refer to:

Ayyar, a lunar month in the Arabic calendar, corresponding to Iyar in the Hebrew calendar and to May in the Gregorian calendar
Ayyār, a person associated with a class of warriors in Iraq and Iran from the 9th to the 12th centuries
Ayyarids or Annazids, a Kurdish Sunni Muslim dynasty that ruled a territory on the present-day Iran-Iraq frontier

People
A. S. P. Ayyar (1899–1963), Indian writer
Ganesh Ayyar (born 1961), Indian executive
Konerirajapuram Vaidyanatha Ayyar (1878-1921), Carnatic Indian vocalist from Tamil Nadu
Reza Ayyar, Iranian footballer

See also
Ajjar of Bulgaria, or Ayyar of Bulgaria, a succession name for the Throne of Bulgaria
Konar (caste), also known as Ayar and Idaiyar, an ethnic group from the Indian state of Tamil Nadu
Iyer (also spelt as Ayyar, Aiyar, Ayer or Aiyer), a caste of Hindu Brahmin communities of Tamil origin

Iyer the Great, also known as Ayyar the Great, 1990 Malayalam language psychological thriller film
Ayyare, 2012 Telugu comedy film